MD (Homeopathy) is the three-year post-graduate degree in homeopathy offered by many universities in India. The course is regulated by the Central Council of Homeopathy. There are 38 colleges in India offering both bachelors and post-graduate courses in homeopathy, and two exclusive PG colleges conducting MD courses in homeopathy.  There are seven specializations offered in MD homeopathy course : Organon of Medicine with Homeopathic Philosophy, Homoeopathic  Materia Medica, Repertory, Practice of Medicine, Homoeopathic Pharmacy, Pediatrics and Psychiatry. In order to get admission for the MD (Homeopathy) course, the candidate should have passed Bachelor of Homeopathic Medicine and Surgery.

References

Homeopathic education
Academic degrees of India
Medical degrees
Medical education in India